The year 1890 in art involved some significant events.

Events
 January 18 – February 23 – Seventh annual exhibition of Les XX in Brussels includes a display of work by Vincent van Gogh. Henry de Groux criticises his paintings but Albert Aurier praises them. From the exhibition, van Gogh sells The Red Vineyard to Anna Boch, said to be the only sale of his work during his lifetime.
 March 20 – April 27 – The Société des Artistes Indépendants show in Paris includes a major display of van Gogh paintings.
 May 20 – Van Gogh moves to Auvers-sur-Oise on the edge of Paris in the care of Dr Paul Gachet where he will produce around seventy paintings in as many days. More than a dozen are size 30 canvases (92 x 65 cm).
 June–July – Van Gogh develops his double-square painting technique, e.g. in the July paintings Wheatfield with Crows and Wheatfield Under Thunderclouds.
 July 27 – Death of Vincent van Gogh: van Gogh perhaps paints Tree Roots, then apparently shoots himself, dying two days later.
 September 20 – Theo van Gogh, assisted by Émile Bernard, mounts an improvised retrospective exhibition of his brother Vincent's works in Theo's former Paris apartment.
 November – Lucien Pissarro settles permanently in London.
 Société Nationale des Beaux-Arts revived in Paris under the leadership of Ernest Meissonier (its President), Pierre Puvis de Chavannes, Jules Dalou, Auguste Rodin, Carolus-Duran, Bracquemond and Albert-Ernest Carrier-Belleuse, with an annual exhibition reviewed as the Salon de Champ-de-Mars, opening a fortnight later than the official Paris Salon.
 Claude Monet begins painting his Haystacks series.
 Newlyn Industrial Class set up at the fishing port in Cornwall (England) and begins production of Newlyn Copper repoussé work.

Works

 Anna Ancher – Syende fiskerpige (Sewing Fisherman's Wife)
 William-Adolphe Bouguereau
 L'Amour et Psyché, enfants
 The Bohemian
 Gabrielle Cot
 A Little Coaxing
 Frank Brangwyn – Funeral at Sea
 Dennis Miller Bunker – Jessica
 Edward Burne-Jones
 The Legend of Briar Rose
 with William Morris and John Henry Dearle – The Adoration of the Magi (tapestry woven by Morris & Co. for Exeter College, Oxford)
 Cyrus Edwin Dallin – Signal of Peace (bronze)
 Thomas Dewing – Summer
 Francis Edwin Elwell – Dickens and Little Nell (bronze)
 Henri Fantin-Latour – Portrait of Sonia
 Fidus (Hugo Höppener) – Light Prayer
 J. W. Godward
 Athenais
 Flowers Of Venus
 A Pompeian Bath
 James Guthrie – The Morning Paper
 John Haberle – The Palette
 William Harnett – The Faithful Colt (Wadsworth Atheneum, Hartford, Connecticut)
 Jonathan Scott Hartley – Daguerre Memorial (Washington, D.C.)
 Martin Johnson Heade – Giant Magnolias on a Blue Velvet Cloth
 Ferdinand Hodler – Night (Kunstmuseum, Bern, Switzerland)
 Winslow Homer
 Cloud Shadows
 Summer Night
 Fernand Khnopff – Silence
 P. S. and Marie Krøyer – Double portrait
 Henry Herbert La Thangue – Leaving Home
 George Dunlop Leslie – Sun and Moon Flowers
 William Logsdail – The Ninth of November (The Lord Mayor's Procession, London, 1888)
 Princess Louise, Marchioness of Lorne – Statue of her mother Queen Victoria, at McGill University, Montreal
 Anna Lea Merritt – Love Locked Out
 Arturo Michelena – Lastenia Tello de Michelena
 John Everett Millais
 Dew-Drenched Furze
 Lingering Autumn
 Claude Monet – Boating on the River Epte
 Albert Joseph Moore – A Summer Night
 Edvard Munch – Night in Saint-Cloud
 Roderic O'Conor – La Lisiere du Bois
 Paul Peel – The Young Botanist
 Edward Poynter – The Visit of the Queen of Sheba to King Solomon
 Henrietta Rae – Ophelia
 Paul Ranson – Nabis Landscape
 Odilon Redon – With Closed Eyes (Musée d'Orsay, Paris)
 Frederic Remington – Aiding a Comrade
 William Blake Richmond – Venus and Anchises
 Tom Roberts – Shearing the Rams (National Gallery of Victoria)
 Auguste Rodin – Brother and Sister (bronze) 
 Henri Rousseau – Self-portrait
 Adalbert Seligmann – Theodor Billroth Operating (approximate date)
 Georges Seurat – Woman Powdering Herself (Courtauld Institute of Art, London)
 Paul Signac – Opus 217: Against the Enamel of a Background Rhythmic with Beats and Angles, Tones, and Tints, Portrait of M. Félix Fénéon in 1890
 Charles Alexander Smith – L'Assemblée des six-comtés
 Joseph-Noël Sylvestre – The Sack of Rome by the Barbarians in 410
 John Tenniel – Dropping the Pilot (political cartoon)
 James Tissot – Le rendez vous secret
 Henri de Toulouse-Lautrec – Dance at the Moulin Rouge

 Vincent van Gogh
 Prisoners Exercising (February)
 At Eternity's Gate (early May)
 Road with Cypress and Star (early May)
 Still Life: Vase with Pink Roses (by early May)
 The Wheat Field, Sunrise (by early May)
 Portrait of Dr. Gachet (two versions)
 Doctor Gachet's Garden in Auvers
 Marguerite Gachet in the Garden
 Marguerite Gachet at the Piano
 Daubigny's Garden (three versions, May–July)
 Almond Blossoms
 L'Arlésienne (four versions, February)
 The Church at Auvers (June)
 Houses at Auvers (June)
 Houses in Auvers
 Street in Auvers
 Thatched Cottages and Houses (May)
 White House at Night (June 16)
 Thatched Cottages by a Hill (July)
 Farms near Auvers (July)
 The Town Hall at Auvers (July)
 Landscape with Castle Auvers at Sunset (June)
 Old Vineyard with Peasant Woman (brush drawing, May)
 Girl in White
 Peasant Woman Against a Background of Wheat (June)
 Landscape with a Carriage and a Train (June)
 Landscape at Auvers in the Rain (July)
 Poppies and Butterflies (April–May) and Long Grass with Butterflies (May) from his Butterflies series
 Tree Roots (July)
 Tree Trunks in the Grass
 Undergrowth with Two Figures (late June)
 Wheat Fields series
 Field with Green Wheat
 Wheat Field at Auvers with white house (June)
 Ears of Wheat (June)
 Wheat Fields near Auvers (June–July)
 Wheat Fields with Auvers in the Background (July)
 The Fields (July)
 Wheat Field with Cornflowers (July)
 Wheat Fields after the Rain (The Plain of Auvers) (July)
 Wheat Stack Under Clouded Sky (July)
 Field with Stacks of Grain (July)
 Sheaves of Wheat
 Harvest near Auvers
 Wheatfield with Crows (July)
 Wheatfield Under Thunderclouds (July)
 Sheaves of Wheat
 Field with Stacks of Grain (July)
 Copies
 Cows (after Jordaens)
 First Steps (after Millet)
 The Good Samaritan (after Delacroix)
 Men Drinking (after Daumier)
 Morning: Peasant Couple Going to Work (after Millet)
 Noon – Rest from Work (after Millet)
 Snow covered Field with a Harrow (after Millet) (January)
 Two Peasant Women Digging in the Snow (after Millet) (April)
 The Woodcutter (after Millet)
 The Raising of Lazarus (after Rembrandt)
 George Frederic Watts
 The All-Pervading
 Little Red Riding Hood (Birmingham Museum and Art Gallery)
 J. B. B. Wellington – Eventide (photogravure)
 William R. Coats – Ypsilanti Water Tower (Ypsilanti, Michigan), winner of Most Phallic Building contest (2003)

Awards
 Grand Prix de Rome, painting: (unknown).
 Grand Prix de Rome, sculpture: Paul-Jean-Baptiste Gasq.
 Grand Prix de Rome, architecture: Emmanuel Pontremoli.
 Grand Prix de Rome, music: (unknown).

Births

January to June
 January 7 – Milton Menasco, American painter and  art director (died 1974)
 February 14 – Nina Hamnett, Welsh-born painter, model and designer (died 1956)
 March 17 – LeMoine Fitzgerald, painter (died 1956)
 April 14 – Gerald Curtis Delano, American painter (died 1972)
 April 21 – Dod Procter (born Doris Shaw), English painter (died 1972)
 May 4 – Franklin Carmichael, painter (died 1945)
 June 12 – Egon Schiele, painter (died 1918)
 June 20 – Giorgio Morandi, painter and printmaker (died 1964)
 June 29 – Robert Laurent, American sculptor (died 1970)

July to December
 July 4 – Jacques Carlu, French architect and designer (died 1976)
 July 28
 Grace Albee, American printmaker (died 1985)
 Pinchus Kremegne, Belarusian sculptor, painter and lithographer (died 1981)
 August 5 – Naum Gabo, Russian sculptor (died 1977)
 September 10 – Elsa Schiaparelli, Italian fashion designer (died 1973)
 September 19 – Montague Dawson, English maritime painter (died 1973)
 October 6 – Phyllis Gardner, British graphic artist and dog breeder, beloved of Rupert Brooke (died 1939)
 October 16 – Paul Strand, American photographer and filmmaker (died 1976)
 November 21 – Jeanne Mammen, German painter (died 1976)
 November 23 – El Lissitzky, Russian designer, architect and photographer (died 1941)
 November 25 – Isaac Rosenberg, British poet and painter (died 1918)
 December 5 - David Bomberg, British painter (died 1957)
 December 6 – Rudolf Schlichter, German painter (died 1955)
 December 11 – Mark Tobey, American abstract expressionist painter (died 1976)
 December 25 - Leon Underwood, English sculptor (died 1975).

Full date unknown
 Petar Dobrović, Serbian Expressionist painter (died 1942)
 Doris Brabham Hatt, English modernist painter (died 1969)
 Ze'ev Raban, Polish Jewish painter (died 1970)
 Jean Xceron, Greek-American painter (died 1967)

Deaths

 January 25 – Antonio Salviati, Italian glassmaker (born 1816)
 March 17 – John Rogers Herbert, English religious painter (born 1810)
 May 5 – Joseph-Nicolas Robert-Fleury, French painter (born 1797)
 May 9 – Friedrich Loos, Austrian Biedermeier style painter, etcher and lithographer (born 1797)
 May 24 – Georgiana McCrae, Australian painter (born 1804)
 July 20 – Sir Richard Wallace, 1st Baronet, English francophile art collector and philanthropist (born 1818)
 July 29 – Vincent van Gogh, Dutch painter (born 1853)
 August 18 – Albert Dubois-Pillet, French Neo-impressionist painter (born 1846)
 August 21 – Charles West Cope, English painter (born 1811)
 August 30 – Marianne North, English botanical artist (born 1830)
 December 12 – Sir Joseph Boehm, sculptor (born 1834) (dies in his London home in the presence of his pupil Princess Louise, Marchioness of Lorne)
 December 13 – François Bocion, Swiss painter (born 1828)
 December 18 – Gerolamo Induno, Italian painter (born 1825)
 December 19 – Eugène Lami, French painter and lithographer (born 1800)
 date unknown
 Auguste Ottin, French sculptor (born 1811)
 Pietro Pezzati, Italian mural painter (born 1828)
 Novak Radonić, Serbian painter (born 1826)

References

 
Years of the 19th century in art
1890s in art